

lo
Lo-Ovral
Lo-Trol

lob-loe
lobaplatin (INN)
lobeline (INN)
lobendazole (INN)
lobenzarit (INN)
lobucavir (INN)
lobuprofen (INN)
Locholest
locicortolone dicibate (INN)
Locoid
Locorten
lodaxaprine (INN)
lodazecar (INN)
lodelaben (INN)
lodenosine (INN)
Lodine
lodinixil (INN)
lodiperone (INN)
Lodosyn
lodoxamide (INN)
Loestrin

lof-lon
lofemizole (INN)
lofendazam (INN)
lofentanil (INN)
lofepramine (INN)
lofexidine (INN)
loflucarban (INN)
Logen
Lomanate
lombazole (INN)
lomefloxacin (INN)
lomerizine (INN)
lometraline (INN)
lometrexol (INN)
lomevactone (INN)
lomifylline (INN)
lomitapide (USAN, INN)
Lomotil (Pfizer)
lomustine (INN)
lonafarnib (USAN)
lonapalene (INN)
lonaprisan (USAN)
lonaprofen (INN)
lonazolac (INN)
lonidamine (INN)
Loniten (Pfizer)
Lonox
lontucirev (USAN)

lop
loperamide oxide (INN)
loperamide (INN)
Lopid (Pfizer)
lopirazepam (INN)
loprazolam (INN)
Lopressidone
Lopressor
loprodiol (INN)
Loprox
Lopurin

lor
Lorabid
loracarbef (INN)
lorajmine (INN)
lorapride (INN)
loratadine (INN)
Loraz
lorazepam (INN)
lorbamate (INN)
lorcainide (INN)
lorcaserin (USAN)
Lorcet-HD
lorcinadol (INN)
loreclezole (INN)
Lorelco
Lorfan
lorglumide (INN)
lormetazepam (INN)
lornoxicam (INN)
lorpiprazole (INN)
Lortab
lortalamine (INN)
lorzafone (INN)

los-lov
losartan (INN)
losigamone (INN)
losindole (INN)
losmapimod (USAN, INN)
losmiprofen (INN)
losoxantrone (INN)
losulazine (INN)
Lotemax
Lotensin
loteprednol (INN)
lotifazole (INN)
lotrafiban (INN)
lotrafilcon A (USAN)
lotrafilcon B (USAN)
Lotrel
lotrifen (INN)
Lotrimin Ultra
Lotrimin
Lotrisone
Lotronex. Redirects to Alosetron.
lotucaine (INN)
Lotusate
lovastatin (INN)
Lovenox (Sanofi-Aventis) redirects to enoxaparin
loviride (INN)

low-loz
Low-Ogestrel
Low-Quel
loxanast (INN)
loxapine (INN)
loxiglumide (INN)
Loxitane
loxoprofen (INN)
loxoribine (INN)
Lozartan
lozilurea (INN)
Lozol